The 2000 NCAA Division I Outdoor Track and Field Championships were the 79th NCAA Men's Division I Outdoor Track and Field Championships and the 19th NCAA Women's Division I Outdoor Track and Field Championships at Wallace Wade Stadium at Duke University in Durham, North Carolina from  May 31–June 3, 2000. In total, forty-two different men's and women's track and field events were contested.

Results

Team Scores

Men

Women

Men's events

100 meters
Final results shown, not prelims
1.2)

200 meters
Final results shown, not prelims
1.0)

400 meters
Final results shown, not prelims

800 meters
Final results shown, not prelims

1500 meters
Final results shown, not prelims

3000 meters steeplechase
Final results shown, not prelims

5000 meters
Final results shown, not prelims

10,000 meters
Final results shown, not prelims

110 meters hurdles
Final results shown, not prelims
-0.3)

400 meters hurdles

4x100-meter relay
Final results shown, not prelims

4x400-meter relay
Final results shown, not prelims

High Jump
Only top eight final results shown; no prelims are listed

Pole Vault
Only top eight final results shown; no prelims are listed

Long Jump
Only top eight final results shown; no prelims are listed

Triple Jump
Only top eight final results shown; no prelims are listed

Shot Put
Only top eight final results shown; no prelims are listed

Discus
Only top eight final results shown; no prelims are listed

Hammer Throw
Only top eight final results shown; no prelims are listed

Javelin Throw
Only top eight final results shown; no prelims are listed

Decathlon

Women's events

w100 meters
Final results shown, not prelims
-0.4

w200 meters
Final results shown, not prelims
0.7)

w400 meters
Final results shown, not prelims

w800 meters
Final results shown, not prelims

w1500 meters
Final results shown, not prelims

3000 meters
Final results shown, not prelims

w5000 meters
Final results shown, not prelims

w10,000 meters
Final results shown, not prelims

100 meters hurdles
Final results shown, not prelims
0.8)

w400 meters hurdles

w4x100-meter relay
Final results shown, not prelims

w4x400-meter relay
Final results shown, not prelims

wHigh Jump
Only top eight final results shown; no prelims are listed

wPole Vault
Only top ten final results shown; no prelims are listed

wLong Jump
Only top eight final results shown; no prelims are listed

wTriple Jump
Only top eight final results shown; no prelims are listed

wShot Put
Only top eight final results shown; no prelims are listed

wDiscus
Only top eight final results shown; no prelims are listed

wHammer Throw
Only top eight final results shown; no prelims are listed

wJavelin Throw
Only top eight final results shown; no prelims are listed

Heptathlon

References

NCAA Men's Outdoor Track and Field Championship
NCAA Division I Outdoor Track And Field Championships
NCAA Division I Outdoor Track And Field Championships
NCAA Division I Outdoor Track and Field Championships
NCAA Division I Outdoor Track and Field Championships
NCAA Women's Outdoor Track and Field Championship